Abbey House may refer to several houses in England:

 Abbey House, Baker Street, London, a possible location of 221B Baker Street, the fictional residence of Sherlock Holmes
 Abbey House, Barrow-in-Furness, a 1914 house by Edwin Lutyens
 Abbey House, Cambridge, a 17th-century house
 Abbey House, Cirencester, Gloucestershire, a former country house
Abbey House, Ranton, Staffordshire, a ruined 1820 house
 Abbey House, Malmesbury, Wiltshire, surrounded by Abbey House Gardens
Abbey House Museum, Kirkstall, West Yorkshire